Anak the Parthian, also known as Anak Pahlavi (flourished 3rd century, died 258), was a Parthian noble who lived during the time of Arsacid Armenia.

Biography 
Anak was an Armenian Parthian nobleman, who was a prince said to be related to the Arsacid dynasty of Armenia or was from the House of Suren, one of the seven branches of the ruling Arsacid dynasty of Sakastan.

Little is known of the life of Anak. According to Elishe, he was the uncle of Tiridates III. He married a Parthian noblewoman called Okohe, who bore him sons. Among their children was Gregory. 

Ardashir I and his son, Shapur I, incited Anak to murder King Khosrov II of Armenia, promising to return his own domain as a reward. Ardashir I was alarmed by the military victories that Khosrov II with his late father, Tiridates II of Armenia had won against him, as he wanted to expand the Sassanid Empire and to annex Armenia.

Anak had won the trust of Khosrov II and had travelled to Vagharshapat. When Anak arrived in Vagharshapat he pretended to take refuge in the Armenian dominions from the persecution of Ardashir I. Anak was hospitably received in Vagharshapat by Khosrov II and then stabbed the king in the heart, also killing Khosrov's wife. Anak was furiously pursued by Armenian soldiers, until he drowned in the Aras River.

Family 
The Armenian army and nobles were outraged by the death of the reigning King and in turn wreaked their vengeance on the family of Anak. The only child to survive from Anak’s family was his infant son Gregory, who was taken to Cappadocia by his former caretakers Sopia and Yevtagh, who had escaped the slaughter of Anak’s family.

Ardashir I took possession of Armenia for himself and it became a part of his empire. Troops loyal to Khosrov II, had his son, Tiridates III, taken to Rome for protection where Tiridates III was raised and his daughter Khosrovidkuht was taken to be raised in Caesarea Mazaca, Cappadocia. The foster parents of Khosrovidukht were Awtay, a nobleman from the family of the Amatuni, and Awtay’s wife, a noblewoman whose name is unknown, who was from the family of the Slkunik.

References

Sources
 H. Hart Milman & J. Murdock, The History of Christianity, from the birth of Christ to the abolition of paganism in the Roman Empire (Google eBook), Harper & Brothers, 1841
 Agat’angeghos, History of the Armenians, SUNY Press, 1976
 B. Eghiayean, Heroes of Hayastan: a dramatic history novel of Armenia, Armenian National Fund, 1993
 M. H. Dodgeon & S. N. C. Lieu, comp. & ed. The Roman Eastern Frontier and the Persian Wars AD 226-363: a documentary history, Routledge, 1994
 J. G. Ghazarian. The Armenian Kingdom in Cilicia During the Crusades: the Integration of Cilician Armenians with the Latins, 1080-1393, Routledge, 2000
 M. Chahin, The Kingdom of Armenia: a History, Routledge, 2001
 R. G. Hovannisian, The Armenian People from Ancient to Modern Times, Volume I: The Dynastic Periods: From Antiquity to the Fourteenth Century, Palgrave Macmillan, 2004
 A. Terian, Patriotism and Piety in Armenian Christianity: the Early Panegyrics on Saint Gregory, St Vladimir’s Seminary Press, 2005
 V. M. Kurkjian, A History of Armenia, Indo-European Publishing, 2008

Arsacid dynasty of Armenia
258 deaths
Year of birth unknown
House of Suren
3rd-century Iranian people